A Farewell to Arms is the twelfth studio album by the Norwegian hard rock band TNT, released on 15 December 2010 in Japan. The album is in stark contrast to the previous two TNT albums, being a very 1980s-melodic rock-oriented album. The album is titled Engine in the US and Scandinavia.

Track listing

Personnel 
TNT
Tony Mills – vocals
Ronni Le Tekrø – guitars
Victor Borge – bass guitar
Diesel Dahl – drums and percussion

Additional personnel
Dag Stokke – keyboards on "God Natt, Marie"
Bård Svendsen – backing vocals, organ on "Barracuda"

Production
Ronni Le Tekrø – producer, mixing
Tommy Hansen – mixing, mastering
Kjartan Hesthagen – engineer
Erland Hvalby – executive producer

Reception
Pre-release press has given the album high praise. Melodicrock.com, who had given the band's previous two releases highly negative reviews, said on a front page update "there's something a little different about this album. It rocks!"

Reception for the album has been generally well received. Hardrock Haven's Derrick Miller gave the album 8.9/10. Scream magazine gave a similar score.

References

2010 albums
TNT (Norwegian band) albums